Charlie or Charles Mohr may refer to:

Charles Mohr (botanist) (1824–1901), German-born American author of botanical studies
Charles Mohr (journalist) (1929–1989), American reporter for Time and The New York Times
Charlie Mohr (1938–1960), American middleweight whose death terminated college boxing

See also
Charles Moore (disambiguation)